is a Japanese talent agency headquartered in Shibuya, Tokyo. It was founded in 2000 and focuses on talent management for tarento, models, actors and musical artists. The headquarters is currently situated on  the ninth floor of the Yushin Main Building.

Current notable talents
This is a list of Platinum Production and Platinum Passport artists that have articles on Wikipedia.

Female

Yuko Ogura
Nonoka Ono
Miwako Kakei
Rumiko Koyanagi
Yui Sakuma
Yuu Tejima
Reiko Tokita
Reina Triendl
Anne Nakamura
Nanao
Aki Higashihara
Chinatsu Wakatsuki
Yukina Kinoshita
Satomi Takasugi
Passpo
Predia
Band-Maid
Rina Sawayama
Sonmi
Ena Fujita
Mio Kudo
Aya Kiguchi
Fuka Kakimoto
Mayuko Iwasa
Yuzuki Aikawa
Satomi Takasugi
Shanadoo
Kaba-chan
Dakota Rose

Male
Toshiki Kashu
Ken Kaneko
Yoshihiko Hakamada
Makoto Uehara
Shinji Nakano
Kohei Hirate
Rio Komiya

Former
Silent Siren

References

External links 
 Platinum Production official website
 
 Platinum Passport official website

Japanese talent agencies
Mass media companies based in Tokyo
Talent agencies based in Tokyo
Entertainment companies of Japan
Modeling agencies
Mass media companies established in 2000
Japanese companies established in 2000